Bijuwa is a Village of Jaimini Municipality Nepal Former ward no. 1 & 9 of Paiyunthanthap village development committee in Baglung District in the Dhaulagiri Zone of central Nepal. At the time of the 2019 A.D. it had a population of 1101 and had 211 houses in the town.

References

Populated places in Baglung District